Sanguisorba hakusanensis, the Korean mountain burnet, is a species of flowering plant in the family Rosaceae, native to Korea and Japan. Its Japanese name means "coming from Haku", a mountain in Japan. 

It is attractive in the garden for its long-lasting pink or lavender, fuzzy, arching plumes, as well as its gray-green, heavily scalloped leaves.

Known cultivars include Sanguisorba hakusanensis 'Lilac Squirrel' (also known as Sanguisorba 'Lilac Squirrel',) it blooms from July to September.

References

hakusanensis